Coach Trip 15, also known as Coach Trip: Road to Marbs is the fifteenth series of Coach Trip in the United Kingdom. The filming took place between October and November 2016 (before Deal or No Deal ended). Production company 12 Yard confirmed that the series is a second "Road to..." version of Coach Trip. The series began airing on E4 on 16 January 2017 for 30 episodes concluding on 24 February 2017.

Contestants

Voting history

Notes
 For winning the Segway Polo activity in the morning Charlotte & Felicity were given a "Double Vote" meaning that whoever they voted for would get two votes instead of one.

 For winning the raft-building activity in the afternoon, Grace & Kath, Kieran & Sam and Faye & Holly were awarded immunity from the vote. Charlotte & Felicity left as the vote was about to commence, meaning that only Calvin & Conrad and Jake & Sophie were eligible to be voted for

 On Day 15, Brendan announced that the next couple to receive a red card would be able to choose another couple to send home alongside them. This would be continuous until a couple gained a red card. This happened to be Dani & Klara on Day 19, who opted to send Kieran & Sam home.

 On Day 24, Bradley & Kevin were ill and did not participate in any of the day's activities, including the vote. They returned the next day.

 On Day 26, Brendan announced that this vote would be a 'Golden Card Vote' - the couple who received the most votes would be immune for the rest of the trip. This happened to be Faye & Holly.

 On Day 29, Brendan announced that this vote would be an anonymous vote - no-one would know who voted for whom. Each couple revealed their vote in an interview after that vote had taken place.

The trip by day

References

2017 British television seasons
Coach Trip series